The Republic of the United States of Indonesia Cabinet was established as a result of the formation of the United States of Indonesia following the transfer of sovereignty from the Dutch colonial power. It lasted less than a year before Indonesia became a unitary state.

Background
President Sukarno, the president of the United States of Indonesia, appointed Mohammad Hatta, Ida Anak Agung Gde Agung, Sri Sultan Hamengku Buwono IX and Sultan Hamid II to choose the cabinet of the new country. Two days later, on 20 December 1949, the cabinet was sworn in, and a week later formally accepted the sovereignty of the nation from the Dutch.

Composition

Only five cabinet members came from the outside the federal state of the Republic of Indonesia. Hatta worked hard to ensure that ministers were appointed based on competence, rather than party affiliation, and four of the ministers from the Republic of Indonesia did not belong to any party. In practice, Hatta had a very dominant position in the cabinet, due to his close relationship with Sukarno, his success at the Dutch–Indonesian Round Table Conference and his role during key events during the War of Independence.

Changes
On 19 January 1950, State Minister Moh. Roem was appointed to the RUSI High Commission in The Hague and resigned from the cabinet. Following a report from the attorney general, State Minister Sultan Hamid II was dismissed on 5 April 1950 for involvement in the rebellion led by Raymond Westerling. Neither of these state ministers were replaced.

The end of the cabinet
On 15 August 1950, the United States of Indonesia ceased to exist and was replaced by the unitary state of Indonesia. On the same day, Prime Minister Hatta returned his mandate to President Sukarno. The Republic of the United States of Indonesia Cabinet was officially dissolved but continued as the cabinet of the Republic of Indonesia until a new cabinet could be formed.

References
 Feith, Herbert (2007) The Decline of Constitutional Democracy in Indonesia  Equinox Publishing (Asia) Pte Ltd, 
 Kahin, George McTurnan (1952) Nationalism and Revolution in Indonesia Cornell University Press, 
 Ricklefs (1982), A History of Modern Indonesia, Macmillan Southeast Asian reprint,

Notes

Cabinets of Indonesia